The Honda CB-1 is a small, light naked sports motorcycle with a  straight-four engine, carrying the model code NC27. In contrast to other models of the Honda CB series, the name is written with a hyphen. In some countries it was marketed as Honda CB400F. 

The bike was first introduced in 1989 and continued through 1990. Originally developed for the Japanese market, the CB-1 was also available in the United States and Canada. Called a "great motorcycle that never found an audience" and "victims of a difficult market" by Cycle World, the final model year 1990 CB-1s available as leftover stock were offered in 1992 at a $600 discount, for $3700 in the US, which in current money would be $ accounting for inflation.

Like many of its stablemates, the CB-1 has straight gear-driven dual camshafts with self-silencing gears to reduce whine.

Gallery

References

CB-1
Sport bikes
Motorcycles introduced in 1989